Ardingly may refer to:
Ardingly, a village and civil parish in West Sussex, England,
Ardingly College, an independent school in the parish of Ardingly,
Ardingly railway station, which formerly served the village and college,
Ardingly, a Southern Railway Schools class railway steam locomotive named after the college,
MV Ardingly, a Stephenson Clarke coastal collier ship.